Rivisondoli is a village and comune in the province of L'Aquila in the Abruzzo region of central Italy. It is a ski resort.

Geography
The village is placed in the plateau of Cinque Miglia and extended on the flank of Monte Calvario.

History
The small mountain town was first mentioned in 724 AD, in a diploma by Grimoald II, Duke of Benevento.

Rivisondoli rose in the 12th century in a strategic position along an important military and commercial route, the "Via degli Abruzzi" and was renowned for its production of weapons. A fire almost completely destroyed the village in 1792. Subsequently, the establishment of the Sulmona-Isernia railway helped the development of tourism. In 1913 the Italian Royal Family had its residence here.

Economy
The village's economy is based on winter tourism, with many skilifts, chairlifts, hotels, restaurants, bars and pubs.

References

External links
History of Rivisondoli in the Highlands of Abruzzo context - Storia di Rivisondoli, nel contesto degli Altipiani Maggiori d'Abruzzo

Cities and towns in Abruzzo